Akira Endo is the name of:

Akira Endo (biochemist) (born 1933), Japanese biochemist
Akira Endo (conductor) (1938–2014), Japanese-American music conductor